A vanity press or vanity publisher, sometimes also subsidy publisher, is a publishing house where anyone can pay to have a book published.  The term "vanity press" is often used pejoratively, implying that an author who uses such a service is publishing out of vanity.

Vanity publishing vs mainstream publishing 

Mainstream publishers never charge authors to publish their books. The publisher bears all the risks of publication and pays all the costs. Because of that financial risk, mainstream publishers are extremely selective in what they will publish, and reject most manuscripts submitted to them. The high level of rejection is why some authors turn to vanity presses to get their work published.  James D. Macdonald says, "Money should always flow towards the author" (sometimes called Yog's Law).

Example in Popular Culture

In The Waltons television show episode, “The Book,” originally broadcast on November 14, 1974, John-Boy Walton is taking an advanced writing class at the university.  His mother sees an advertisement for a publishing company and gives them a sample of his work.  They offer to publish him, with a contract he signs over his father’s warning and without legal advice.  For a time, he has a slightly-swelled head as a “published author,” but then learns the company is a vanity press and that he must pay for the publication of the books.

Vanity publishing vs hybrid publishing 

Hybrid publishing is the source of lively debate in the publishing industry, with many viewing hybrid publishers as vanity presses in disguise.  However a true hybrid publisher is selective in what they publish and will share the costs (and therefore the risks) with the author, whereas with a vanity press, the author pays the full cost of production and therefore carries all the risk. The vanity press then has absolutely no interest in whether the book is suitable for publication or good enough to sell.  

Given the bad reputation of vanity publishing, many vanity presses are rebranding themselves as hybrids, leading to exploitation of writers. The Society of Authors (SoA) and the Writers’ Guild of Great Britain (WGGB) have called for reform of the ‘hybrid’ / paid-for publishing sector. The trade unions, who together represent 14,800 authors, have jointly published "Is it a steal? An investigation into ‘hybrid’ / paid-for publishing services" to expose widespread bad practice among companies that charge writers to publish their work while taking their rights.

Vanity publishing vs assisted self-publishing

It is often stated that many famous authors have used vanity publishers in the past, such as Mark Twain or Jane Austen. This is incorrect and confuses self-publishing with vanity publishing.  

In a variant of Yog's law for self-publishing, author John Scalzi has proposed this alternate, to distinguish self-publishing from vanity publishing, "While in the process of self-publishing, money and rights are controlled by the writer." 

Self-publishing is distinguished from vanity publishing by the writer maintaining control of copyright as well as the editorial and publishing process, including marketing and distribution.

Vanity publishing scams 

Vanity presses often engage in deceptive practices or offer costly, poor-quality services with limited recourse available to the writer.  In the US, these practices have been cited by the Better Business Bureau as unfavorable reports by consumers.

One common (scam) model of a vanity press is described by Umberto Eco in Foucault's Pendulum. The company pretends to operate a traditional publishing arm, (where the publishing house bears all the cost).  However, when an author submits their work, they are always told it does not quite meet the standards required for traditional publishing. However, the company will publish it if the author pays for something, e.g. engages their professional editor, or commits to buying a large number of printed copies of the book, or some other excuse.  The exorbitant fee charged for these services will, in fact, cover the entirety of the vanity publisher's costs in producing the book.

Vanity publishing in other media

The vanity press model exists for other media such as videos, music and photography. A notable example is ARK Music Factory, which, for a fee, produced and released Rebecca Black's 2011 viral video "Friday".. 

Vanity academic journals also exist, often called bogus journals, which will publish with little or no editorial oversight (although they may claim to be peer reviewed).  One such bogus journal (International Journal of Advanced Computer Technology) accepted for publication a paper called Get me off Your Fucking Mailing List consisting of the sentence "Get me off your fucking mailing list." repeated many times.

Vanity photography magazines often have little or no physical circulation, relying instead on the submitting photographers buying the magazine after publication.  Some also charge a submission fee.  Magazines such as Lucy's, Jute, and Pump – all managed by parent publisher Kavyar – often accept photograph submissions for free, or for a minimal fee to be featured on a magazine cover.

History

The term vanity press appeared in mainstream U.S. publications as early as 1941. That was the year that C. M. Flumiani was sentenced to 18 months in a US prison for mail fraud, arising from his scheme that promised book promotion (a line in a catalog), expert editing (they accepted all books), and acting as agent bringing books to his own publishing houses.

By 1956, the three leading American vanity presses (Vantage Press, Exposition Press, and Pageant Press) were each publishing more than 100 titles per year.

Ernest Vincent Wright, author of the 1939 novel Gadsby, written entirely in lipogram, was unable to find a publisher for his work and ultimately chose to publish it through a vanity press.

Examples
 American Biographical Institute
 Austin Macauley Publishers (previously Austin & Macauley)
 Dorrance Publishing
 Famous Poets Society
 iUniverse
 Poetry.com, The International Library of Poetry
 Tate Publishing & Enterprises (there are at least three companies called Tate Publishing; the others include a reputable art publisher and a defunct software book publisher)
 Tellwell Talent, a Canadian-based vanity press best-known for releasing the book Newbia by Chelee Cromwell.
 Vantage Press
 Xlibris

See also

 Accessible publishing
 Alternative media
 Article processing charge
 Atlanta Nights
 Author mill
 Custom media
 Dōjin
 Dynamic publishing
 Independent music
 List of self-publishing companies
 Offset printing
 Online shopping
 Predatory open access publishing
 Print on demand
 Samizdat
 Self Publish, Be Happy
 Self publishing
 :Category:Self-publishing
 Small press
 Vanity award
 Vanity gallery
 Vanity label
 Variable data printing
 Web-to-print

Notes

External links

 Writer Beware on Vanity Presses
 Vanity Publishing Information Advice and Warning
 Self-Publishers Flourish as Writers Pay the Tab

Publishing